The following is the list of official public holidays recognized by the Government of Russia. On these days, government offices, embassies and some shops, are closed. If the date of observance falls on a weekend, the following Monday will be a day off in lieu of the holiday.

Major national holidays

New Year Holiday
In addition to New Year's Day (Новый год, Novy god) on 1 January, 2–5 January are public holidays as well, called New Year holiday (novogodniye kanikuly). The holiday includes 6 and 8 January, with Christmas being 7 January, declared as non-working days by law. Until 2005, only 1 and 2 January were public holidays.

Orthodox Christmas day

Christmas in Russia (Рождество Христово, Rozhdestvo Khristovo) is celebrated on 25 December (Julian calendar) which falls on 7 January (Gregorian calendar) and commemorates the birth of Jesus Christ. The public holiday was re-established in 1991, following the decades of suppression of religion and state atheism of the Soviet Union.

Defender of the Fatherland Day

The Defender of the Fatherland Day (День защитника Отечествa, Den zashchitnika Otechestva) is celebrated on 23 February and is dedicated to veterans and service personnel of the Russian Armed Forces, though it is often colloquially known as Men's Day (День Мужчин, Den' Muzhchin) and commonly treated as a celebration of all men. The holiday was established in 1918 as it is connected to the decree published that day by the Council of People's Commissars that formalized the official mandatory conscription in the Red Army.

International Women's Day

On the eve of World War I campaigning for peace, Russian women observed their first International Women's Day on the last Sunday in February 1913. In 1913 following discussions, International Women's Day was transferred to 8 March and has remained the global date for International Women's Day ever since.

Spring and Labour Day 

In the former Soviet Union, 1 May was International Workers' Day and was celebrated with huge parades in cities like Moscow. Though the celebrations are low-key nowadays, several groups march on that day to protest grievances the workers have. Since 1992, May Day is officially called "The Day of Spring and Labour".

Victory Day

On 9 May, Russia celebrates the victory over Nazi Germany, while remembering those who died in order to achieve it. On 9 May 1945 (by Moscow time) the German military surrendered to the Soviet Union and the Allies of World War II in Berlin (Karlshorst). Victory Day (День Победы, Den Pobedy) is by far one of the biggest Russian holidays. It commemorates those who died in World War II and pays tribute to survivors and veterans. Flowers and wreaths are laid on wartime graves and special parties and concerts are organized for veterans. In the evening there is a firework display. A large ground and air military parade, hosted by the President of the Russian Federation, is annually organized in Moscow on Red Square. Similar ground, air and marine (if possible) parades are organized in several other Russian cities (which are Hero Cities or have military districts or fleet headquarters primarily).

Russia Day

Russia Day (День России, Den Rossii) is celebrated on June 12. On this day, in 1991, the Russian parliament formally declared Russian sovereignty from the Soviet Union. The holiday was officially established in 1992. 

Initially it was named Day of the Adoption of the Declaration of Sovereignty of the Russian Federation, then on 1 February 2002 it was officially renamed Russia Day (in 1998 Boris Yeltsin offered this name socially).

In Russian society there is a misconception that this holiday is also called "Russia's Independence Day", but it never has had such a name in official documents. According to a survey by Levada Center in May 2009, 44% of respondents named the holiday as "Independence Day of Russia".

Unity Day

Unity Day (День народного единства, Den narodnogo edinstva) was first celebrated on 4 November 2005, commemorating the popular uprising led by Kuzma Minin and Dmitry Pozharsky which ejected Polish invaders from Moscow in November 1612, and more generally the end of Time of Troubles and foreign intervention in Russia. The event was marked by a public holiday which was held in Russia on 22 October (Old Style) from 1649 till 1917. Its name alludes to the idea that all the classes of Russian society willingly united to preserve Russian statehood when its demise seemed inevitable, even though there was neither a Tsar nor Patriarch to guide them. Most observers view this as a replacement for the October Revolution Day. National Unity Day is also known as Consolidation Day (as an alternative translation), which people in Russia celebrate between 3-4 November.

List of other public holidays, commemorative and professional days

Popular holidays which are not public holidays
 New Year according to Julian Calendar on January 14
 Tatiana Day (Students Day) on January 25
 Valentine's Day on February 14
 Maslenitsa (a week before the Great Lent) Start date changes every year, depending on the beginning of the Great Lent (in 2022: 27 February to 6 March)
 Internal Troops and National Guard Servicemen's Day on March 27
 Annunciation on April 7
 Pascha (floating Sunday between April 4 and May 8)
 Cosmonautics Day on April 12
 Soviet Air Defense Forces Day on the Second Sunday of April
 Russian State Fire Service Day on April 30
 Radio Day on May 7
 Saints Cyril and Methodius' Day on May 24 (also Slavonic Literature and Culture Day)
 Border Guards Day on May 28, celebrating the anniversary of the Border Service of the Federal Security Service of the Russian Federation
 Ivan Kupala Day on July 7 (should be 24 June, St. John's Day and Summer Solistice, but shifted due to Julian calendar usage)
 Day of Remembrance and Sorrow on 22 June, marking the start of Operation Barbarossa — the Nazi invasion of the USSR
 Paratroopers' Day on August 2
 Apple Feast of the Saviour on August 19 (also the Great Feast of the Transfiguration of Jesus)
 Great Feast of the Dormition of the Mother of God on August 28
 Knowledge Day on September 1 (traditionally, the first day of school)
 Day of Tankmen on the Second Sunday of September
 Father's Day on the third Sunday of October
 October Revolution Day on November 7
 Mother's Day on the last Sunday of November
 Naval Infantry Day on November 27
 (Western) Christmas Day on December 25

See also
 Public holidays in the Soviet Union
 Days of Military Honour

References

 
Russia
Observances in Russia
Holidays